Akosombo International School (AIS) is a Ghanaian coeducational international second-cycle institution located at Akosombo in the Asuogyaman District of the Eastern Region.  It is operated by the Volta River Authority.

History
The school was established in 1962 by the Volta River Authority.

Notable former pupils

 Kwabena Bediako, scientist
 Elwin Cockett, the Archdeacon of West Ham in the Church of England
 Samira Bawumia, the Second Lady of the Republic of Ghana.
 Lucia Addae, Executive Secretary of West Africa Pharmaceutical Manufacturers Association (WAPMA)
 Lydia Forson, Actress, Writer, Producer
 Jessica Opare-Saforo, Media personality, TV and radio broadcaster

See also

 Education in Ghana
 List of international schools
 List of senior high schools in Ghana

References

1962 establishments in Ghana
Education in the Eastern Region (Ghana)
Educational institutions established in 1962
High schools and secondary schools in Ghana
International high schools
International schools in Ghana
Volta River Authority
Boarding schools in Ghana